North Tzoumerka is a municipality in the Ioannina regional unit, Epirus, Greece. The seat of the municipality is the village Pramanta. The municipality has an area of 358.334 km2. The municipality is named after the Tzoumerka mountains.

Municipality
The municipality North Tzoumerka was formed at the 2011 local government reform by the merger of the following 7 former municipalities, that became municipal units:
Kalarites
Katsanochoria
Matsouki
Pramanta
Sirako
Tzoumerka
Vathypedo

References

Populated places in Ioannina (regional unit)
Municipalities of Epirus (region)